FFH, also known as Far from Home, are an American contemporary Christian band from Lancaster, Pennsylvania.

Formed in 1993, FFH released six independent projects before being signed by Essential Records. Since then, they have released seven studio albums, as well as a "greatest-hits" album.

Background
The group formed as Four for Harmony, an a cappella group. Over time they developed a vocal acoustic pop style, similar to that of Avalon, and changed their name to Far from Home. That name was being used by a secular duo and they became known as FFH.

Following the release of their 2007 album, Worship in the Waiting, they took a break from touring.

Jeromy Deibler was diagnosed with multiple sclerosis in 2007 after he and Jennifer got back from Africa. Deibler is able to keep his MS under control with chemotherapy. The band returned in 2009 as a duo when members Jennifer and Jeromy Deibler released their independent album Wide Open Spaces. It was re-released in 2010 on P-ID Blue. It was followed up in 2011 by One Silent Night: An FFH Christmas. Then in 2012, FFH released their second worship album, and 11th studio album since their major label debut, The Way We Worship.

Jeromy is a full-time worship leader at Journey Christian Church in Irvine, California.

Band members
Jennifer Lois Deibler (born June 14, 1972: née; Els, Hillsboro, Missouri) – vocals 
Jeromy Shawn Deibler (born August 19, 1974, Lancaster, Pennsylvania) – piano, guitar, vocals

Former
Michael Dean Boggs (born November 8, 1978, Tulsa, Oklahoma) – guitar, vocals (until 2007)
Brian Richard Smith (born July 27, 1974, Quarryville, Pennsylvania) – bass, vocals (until 2007)
Jonathan Firey – guitar
Chris Ulery – bass
Steve Croyle – vocals, guitar (until 1999)
Chad Mussmon – vocal, guitar (until 1997)

Discography

Singles
Numerous FFH singles have charted, including "Fly Away" and "Watching Over Me" which reached the No. 1 on Christian Adult Contemporary radio and the Top 5 on Christian Hit Radio, "On My Cross" which had a two-week run at No. 1 on inspirational radio. Other singles include "One of These Days", "Big Fish", "I Want to Be Like You" and "What It Feels Like". "Undone" was released in 2010 and reached No. 18 on the Billboard Hot Christian Songs chart.

Books
Far From Home: Stories From the Road (2001), Howard Publishing.

References

External links
 

Christian pop groups
Musical groups established in 1993
Musical groups from Pennsylvania